The Gongboxia Dam is a concrete face rock-fill embankment dam on the Yellow River in Longhua County, Qinghai Province, China. The dam supports a 1,500 MW hydroelectric power station.

Construction on the dam began in July 2000 by diverting the river and by August 15 the next year, the river was diverted and excavation began on the foundation. On August 1, 2002, workers began to create the embankment and by October the next year, the dam's body was almost complete. Concrete pouring on the face slab began in March 2004 and was complete by June. Filling of the reservoir began in August and in 2006 the project was complete.

See also

List of power stations in China
List of dams and reservoirs in China

References

Hydroelectric power stations in Qinghai
Dams in China
Dams on the Yellow River
Concrete-face rock-fill dams
Dams completed in 2006